Mauricio Daniel Nanni Lima (born 12 July 1979 in Montevideo) is a former Uruguayan footballer, who played as a goalkeeper.

International career

Under-20
Nanni played at 1999 FIFA World Youth Championship as back up of Fabián Carini.

Senior
Nanni capped for senior side at 2003 Lunar New Year Cup.

References

External links

Profile at TenfielDigital 

Living people
1979 births
Footballers from Montevideo
Uruguayan footballers
Uruguay under-20 international footballers
Uruguay international footballers
Association football goalkeepers
Montevideo Wanderers F.C. players
Defensor Sporting players
Racing de Ferrol footballers
Racing de Santander players
Comisión de Actividades Infantiles footballers
Sportivo Cerrito players
C.A. Bella Vista players
C.D. Marathón players
Niki Volos F.C. players
Uruguayan Primera División players
Expatriate footballers in Honduras
Expatriate footballers in Spain
Expatriate footballers in Greece